Scott Nimerfro (July 12, 1961 – April 17, 2016) was an American writer and producer, best known for the television series Pushing Daisies, Hannibal and for serving as an associate producer on Bryan Singer's 2000 film X-Men.

Television work

Episodes of Pushing Daisies 
 "Smell of Success" (1.07)
 "The Norwegians" (2.10)

Episodes of Ringer 
 "What We Have Is Worth the Pain" (1.17)
 "It's Called Improvising, Bitch!" (1.21)

Episodes of Hannibal 
 "Coquilles" (1.06) (with Bryan Fuller)
 "Rôti" (1.11) (with Steve Lightfoot and Bryan Fuller)
 "Savoureux" (1.13) (with Steve Lightfoot and Bryan Fuller)
 "Takiawase" (2.04) (with Bryan Fuller)
 "Su-zakana" (2.08)

Episodes of Once Upon A Time 
 "Breaking Glass" (4.05) (with Kalinda Vazquez)
 "Shattered Sight" (4.10) (with Tze Chun)
 "Heart of Gold" (4.18) (with Tze Chun)

Awards and nominations 
In 2008, Nimerfro was nominated for a Writers Guild of America award for his work on Pushing Daisies.

Death 
Nimerfro died on April 17, 2016, aged 54 after a year long battle with angiosarcoma.

The Once Upon a Time episode "Sisters" is dedicated to his memory.

References

External links 
 
 

1961 births
2016 deaths
American television writers
Deaths from angiosarcoma
American male television writers
People from Richfield, Minnesota
Screenwriters from Minnesota
Deaths from cancer in Minnesota
Television producers from Minnesota